Torcaso v. Watkins, 367 U.S. 488 (1961), was a United States Supreme Court case in which the court reaffirmed that the United States Constitution prohibits states and the federal government from requiring any kind of religious test for public office, in this specific case as a notary public.

Background
In the early 1960s, the Governor of Maryland appointed Roy Torcaso (November 13, 1910 – June 9, 2007) as a notary public. At the time, the Constitution of Maryland required "a declaration of belief in the existence of God" for a person to hold "any office of profit or trust in this State".

Torcaso, an atheist, refused to make such a statement, and his appointment was consequently revoked. Torcaso, believing his constitutional rights to freedom of religious expression had been infringed, filed suit in a Maryland Circuit Court, only to be rebuffed. The Circuit Court rejected his claim, and the Maryland Court of Appeals held that the requirement in the Maryland Constitution for a declaration of belief in God as a qualification for office was self-executing and did not require any implementing legislation to be enacted by the state legislature.

The Court of Appeals justified its decision thus:

Torcaso took the matter to the United States Supreme Court, where it was heard on April 24, 1961.

Decision
The Court unanimously found that Maryland's requirement for a person holding public office to state a belief in God violated the First and Fourteenth Amendments to the United States Constitution.

The Court had established in Everson v. Board of Education (1947):

Writing for the Court, Justice Hugo Black recalled Everson v. Board of Education and explicitly linked Torcaso v. Watkins to its conclusions:

Rebuffing the judgment of the Maryland Court of Appeals, Justice Black added: "The fact, however, that a person is not compelled to hold public office cannot possibly be an excuse for barring him from office by state-imposed criteria forbidden by the Constitution."

The Court did not base its holding on the no religious test clause of Article VI. In Footnote 1 of the opinion, Justice Black wrote:

Secular humanism as a religion

Some religious groups have occasionally argued that, in Torcaso v. Watkins, the Supreme Court "found" secular humanism to be a religion. This assertion is based on a reference, by Justice Black in footnote number 11 of the Court's finding, to court cases where organized groups of self-identified humanists, or ethicists, meeting on a regular basis to share and celebrate their beliefs, have been granted religious-based tax exemptions. Religious groups such as those supporting causes such as teaching creationism in schools have seized upon Justice Black's use of the term "secular humanism" in his footnote as a "finding" that any secular or evolution-based activity is a religion under US law.

See also
Bernal v. Fainter (restriction on noncitizens being notaries found unconstitutional)
Silverman v. Campbell (a similar case in the South Carolina Supreme Court)
List of United States Supreme Court cases, volume 367
Secular humanism

References

Further reading
.
.

External links

1961 in Maryland
1961 in religion
1961 in United States case law
Atheism in the United States
History of Maryland
Religious discrimination in Maryland
Religious controversies in the United States
Secularism in Maryland
United States Supreme Court cases
United States Supreme Court cases of the Warren Court
United States free exercise of religion case law
Notary